Oberea humeralis is a species of beetle in the family Cerambycidae. It was described by Gressitt in 1939. It is known from China.

References

humeralis
Beetles described in 1939